Agape is commonly used by Christians to describe God's love, defining it as unconditional love.

Agape may also refer to:
Agape feast, certain meals celebrated by early Christians

People
Agape, Chionia, and Irene, Christian virgin-martyrs

Books
Agapē Agape, a novel by William Gaddis
Eros and Agape, a two-volume treatise by Swedish theologian Anders Nygren

Churches and organizations
Agape Europe, the Western European branch of Cru, Campus Crusade for Christ
Agape Flights, a religious charity that operates flights carrying cargo and personnel between Florida and missionaries in the Caribbean.
Agape Foundation Fund for Nonviolent Social Change, an American non-profit foundation
Agape International Spiritual Center, a New Thought church in Culver City, California
Agape Church, Rohri Taluka Sukkur District List of churches in Pakistan
Agape Church of God Full Gospel Church, Thachukunnu, Puthuppally, Kottayam
Agape Church, Five Points, Denver 
Agape College (Little Rock, Arkansas), a college in Little Rock, Arkansas
Agape College, Dimapur
 Agape Lodge, a California-based chapter of the Ordo Templi Orientis in the 1930s and 40s

Music
Agape (Christian rapper)
Jeunes Agape, an award-winning Trinidad and Tobago musical-drama group
Agape Music Festival, an annual Christian music festival in Greenville, Illinois

Albums
Agápē (mixtape), a 2012 mixtape by JoJo
Agape – Agape, a 1983 album by Popol Vuh
Agape, 2001 album by Yoo Young-jin
Agape, 1975 album by Rick Cassidy on Homespun Records
Agapé, 2019 album by Shy'm

Songs
"Agape" (song), a song by Zhang Liyin
"Agapé", a song by Melocure
"Agapi", a song by Despina Vandi from 10 Hronia Mazi
"Agape", a song by Bear's Den
"Agape", a song on Wake Up, Girls!

Other uses 
 Agape (moth), a genus of moth